Streeter is an unincorporated community in Summers County, West Virginia, United States. Streeter is west of Hinton.

References

External links
 

Unincorporated communities in Summers County, West Virginia
Unincorporated communities in West Virginia